National Highway 154 (NH 154) is a  National Highway in India.

References

National highways in India
National Highways in Himachal Pradesh
National Highways in Punjab, India
Transport in Pathankot